The Golden Drum Award is the Commonwealth of Dominica's highest cultural award. 

Instituted in 1982, the Golden Drum Award is issued annually to individuals, groups or institutions that have made outstanding contributions to the development of Dominica's art and culture spanning at least 20 years. Presented at the same ceremony are Special Recognition Awards for notable successes in a particular field of arts and culture.

References

Orders, decorations, and medals of Dominica
Awards established in 1982